Haunting of the Mary Celeste is a 2020 American horror thriller film directed by Shana Betz with a script from David Ross and Jerome Oliver. The film stars Emily Swallow, Richard Roundtree, Ava Acres, Pierre Adele, Dominic DeVore, and Alice Hunter.

It was released on October 23, 2020, by Vertical Entertainment.

Premise
Rachel, a concerned researcher, and her team have set out to sea to prove that the disappearance of a family and crew from a merchant ship was for reasons having to do with the supernatural. Her theory that those on the Mary Celeste vanished into a "rift" between dimensions proves true as the boat breaks down and her crew begins to vanish one by one.

Cast
 Emily Swallow as Rachel
 Richard Roundtree as Tulls
 Ava Acres as Jennifer / Sophia
 Pierre Adele as Aldo
 Dominic DeVore as Grant
 Alice Hunter as Cassandra

References

External links
 
 

2020 films
2020 horror thriller films
American horror thriller films
2020s English-language films
2020s American films